is a 1959 Japanese drama directed by Yasujirō Ozu, starring Nakamura Ganjirō II and Machiko Kyō. It is a remake of Ozu's own black-and-white silent film A Story of Floating Weeds (1934) and considered one of the greatest films ever made.

Plot
During the summer of 1958 at a seaside town on the Inland Sea, a travelling theatre troupe arrives by ship, headed by the troupe's lead actor and owner, Komajuro. While the rest of the troupe goes around the town to publicize their appearance, Komajuro visits his former mistress, Oyoshi, who runs a small eatery in the town. They have a grown-up son, Kiyoshi, who works at the post office as a mail clerk and is saving up to study at the university. However, he doesn't know who Komajuro is, having been told he is his uncle. Komajuro invites Kiyoshi to go fishing at sea.

When Sumiko, the lead actress of the troupe and Komajuro's present girlfriend, learns that Komajuro is visiting his former mistress, she becomes jealous and visits Oyoshi's eatery. Komajuro chases her away quickly and confronts her. He tells her to back off from his son and decides to break up with her. Sumiko calls Komajuro an ingrate and reminds him of the times she has helped him out in the past.

One day, Sumiko offers Kayo, a young actress from the same troupe, some money and asks her to seduce Kiyoshi. Although Kayo is initially reluctant, she agrees after Sumiko's insistence without being told why. However, after knowing Kiyoshi for some time, she falls for him and decides to tell Kiyoshi the truth about how their relationship started. Kiyoshi is undaunted and says it does not matter to him, and eventually their relationship is discovered by Komajuro.

Komajuro confronts Kayo, who tells him of Sumiko's setup, but only after asserting she now loves Kiyoshi and is not doing it for money. Komajuro attacks Sumiko and tells her to disappear from his sight. She pleads for reconciliation but he is indignant.

Meanwhile, the troupe's old-fashioned kabuki-style performances fail to attract the town's residents; the other actors pursue their own romantic diversions at local businesses, including a brothel and a barber shop. Eventually, the manager of the troupe abandons them and a principal supporting player absconds with the remaining funds. Komajuro has no choice but to disband the troupe, and they meet for a melancholy last night together. Komajuro then goes to Oyoshi's place and tells her of the break-up. Oyoshi persuades him to tell Kiyoshi the truth about his parenthood and then stay together with them at her place as a family. Komajuro agrees.

When Kiyoshi returns with Kayo, Komajuro becomes so enraged that he beats both of them repeatedly, leading to a tussle between Kiyoshi and him. To stifle the brawl, Oyoshi reveals to him the truth about Komajuro. Kiyoshi first responds that he had suspected it all along, but then refuses to accept Komajuro as his father, saying he has coped well without one so far and goes upstairs. Taking in Kiyoshi's reaction, Komajuro decides to leave after all. Kayo wants to join Komajuro to help him achieve success for the family, but a chastened Komajuro asks her to stay to help make Kiyoshi a fine man, as Komajuro's always hoped. Kiyoshi later has a change of heart and goes downstairs to look for Komajuro, but his father has already left, and Oyoshi tells Kiyoshi to let him go.

At the train station in town, Komajuro tries to light a cigarette but has no matches. Sumiko, who is sitting nearby, offers him a light. She asks where he is going and asks to accompany him since she now has no place to go. They reconcile and Sumiko decides to join Komajuro to start anew under another impresario at Kuwana.

Cast

Production

Floating Weeds, Ozu's only film for Daiei, was produced at the studio's urging after he completed Good Morning, which had fulfilled the director's contractual obligation to complete one film per year for Shochiku. Ozu first planned to remake A Story of Floating Weeds for Shochiku, and the title was intended to be A Ham Actor ("radish actor"); the stars (most of whom were attached to Shochiku) were to include Eitarō Shindō and Chikage Awashima as the primary leads, Masami Taura and Ineko Arima as the youth leads, and Isuzu Yamada as the former mistress. Filming had been delayed in 1958 due to an unexpectedly mild winter in the Niigata region, where Ozu had hoped to film a snowy location; when the Daiei opportunity arose, he followed through on his plan to move filming to a summer setting in seaside Wakayama. The actors were replaced mostly with Daiei contract players, and the title was changed in deference to Nakamura Ganjirō II, the respected kabuki theater star who played the lead. (When Kiyoshi charges Komajūrō with hamming it up, the actor asserts that it's the style of acting that his public pays to see.)

In a bit of stunt casting, Ozu did secure Kōji Mitsui from Shochiku for his seventh and final role for the director, as the character who drives the subplot about the amorous escapades of the supporting players; as Hideo Mitsui, the actor had portrayed the protagonist's son in the 1934 version.
 
The troupe is first observed performing a scene from a play about Chuji Kunisada, a 19th-century historical figure who was romanticised as a forest-dwelling Robin-Hood-like hero in a number of plays, novels, and films. In the scene shown, Kunisada (played by Sumiko) is taking his leave of his faithful companions, Gantetsu and Jōhachi, on Mt. Akagi. Wild geese flying south for the winter and crows returning to their nests are used as images of parting. Ozu includes a small joke in the staging of the scene to confirm that this is not a very polished troupe of actors. When Gantetsu delivers the line, "The wild geese are calling as they fly towards the southern skies," he points off-stage into the auditorium. So when Sumiko, as Chuji, turns stage left to deliver the line "And the moon is descending behind the western mountains," she is actually facing east.

Despite Nakamura Ganjirō II's fame as a noted star of kabuki theater, he is shown applying full makeup but not actually filmed onstage, though he is heard off-screen as the audience watches him perform and players backstage lament the show's poor attendance. Nakamura recalled that he and Machiko Kyo got sick with a cold after filming the confrontation scene between their characters in the rain.

Kazuo Miyagawa served as cinematographer for the film, replacing Ozu's favorite cameraman, Yuharu Atsuta. In an interview, Ozu described the film as an experiment on how to bring life to an old fashioned story in a modern setting and noted that by working with Miyagawa, he realized that different colors required varying degrees of lighting.

Release

Theatrical 
Floating Weeds was released on November 17, 1959. It was released theatrically in the United States by Altura Films International on November 24, 1970.

Home media
Floating Weeds was released on Region 1 DVD by The Criterion Collection as a two-disc set with A Story of Floating Weeds. An alternate audio track contains a commentary by Roger Ebert.

Subtitles for the Criterion edition of Floating Weeds take liberty with lines delivered by Kōji Mitsui early in the film: while wandering through the village in Kabuki costume promoting the troupe's appearance, he is asked his name by a prostitute he considers unattractive. He replies "Kinnosuke" rather than his character's actual name, Kichinosuke. When she appears surprised, he clarifies that he’s "Kin-Chan," teasing her that he is the famous Kabuki actor Kinnosuke Nakamura, who was popularly known as "Kin-Chan," an abbreviation of his name appended with "Chan," a Japanese honorific of endearment. However, counter to Mitsui's clear pronunciations, the Criterion subtitle has him first identify himself as "Mifune," and after her surprise he says "Toshiro," presumably an effort to make the exchange relevant to Western audiences by using the name of a more identifiable Japanese star.

Reception
Floating Weeds is widely acclaimed by film critics. Roger Ebert gave the film four stars out of four, and included it on his "Ten Greatest Films of all Time" in 1991.  Alan Bett of The Skinny gave the film a full five stars. Tom Dawson of BBC gave it four stars out of five. Allan Hunter of Daily Express rated it 4/5, while Stuart Henderson of PopMatters gave it a 9/10. 
The film  holds a 96% rating on Rotten Tomatoes based on reviews from 23 critics. The site's critical consensus states: "Floating Weeds boasts the visual beauty and deep tenderness of director Yasujiro Ozu's most memorable films -- and it's one of the few the master shot in color."

In 2002, American film director James Mangold listed Floating Weeds as one of the best films of all time. He said, "Ozu is the world's greatest director film geeks have never heard of. A poet, humanitarian, stylist, innovator - and a brilliant actors' director. I would recommend the film to anyone with a heart who knows direction is about more than camera moves." In 2009 the film was ranked at No. 36 on the list of the Greatest Japanese Films of All Time by Japanese film magazine Kinema Junpo. In 2012, Spanish film director José Luis Guerín, as well as two other directors, listed the film as one of the greatest ever made.

References

External links
 
 
 
 Voted #18 on The Arts and Faith Top 100 Films (2010) 
Floating Weeds an essay by David Ehrenstein at the Criterion Collection
Cinema Then, Cinema Now: Floating Weeds a 1988 discussion of the film hosted by Jerry Carlson of CUNY TV

1959 films
1959 drama films
Japanese drama films
Films directed by Yasujirō Ozu
Daiei Film films
Films about actors
Films set in Mie Prefecture
Remakes of Japanese films
Sound film remakes of silent films
Films with screenplays by Yasujirō Ozu
Films with screenplays by Kogo Noda
Films produced by Masaichi Nagata
1950s Japanese films